Rax Roast Beef is a regional U.S. fast food restaurant chain specializing in roast beef sandwiches. The company has been through many iterations, declaring bankruptcy more than once, rising to as many as 504 locations in 38 U.S. states in the 1980s and falling to fewer than 20 locations on more than one occasion. As of 2022, Rax is based in Ironton, Ohio, and has between five and eight (see below) franchisee-owned restaurants still in operation.

History

Origins 
Rax was originally known as "JAX Roast Beef", founded by Jack Roschman in 1967, in Springfield, Ohio. In 1969, Roschman sold the chain to General Foods, which then changed the name of the restaurants to "RIX Roast Beef". General Foods ran the chain until 1972, when most of the restaurants closed down. The remaining 10 units were franchised units owned by the Restaurant Administration Corporation (RAC), headed by J. Patrick Ross, a franchisee of multiple restaurant chains including Wendy's, Ponderosa Steak House, and Long John Silver's.

RAC purchased the remainder of RIX from General Foods, and returned the JAX name to the restaurants. RAC eventually decided to focus on the roast beef business, and began franchising the chain. The JAX restaurants were renamed Rax in 1977 to be more suitable for trademarking and franchising, with the first Rax-branded franchise restaurant opening in Columbus, Ohio.  RAC was renamed Rax Systems Inc., then again to Rax Restaurants Inc. in 1982.  By then, Rax had grown to over 221 restaurants in 25 states.

In 1981, the chain introduced baked potatoes and salad bars to its menu. By June 1984, the 300th location had opened, in Fort Wayne, Indiana. In 1988, the company decided to reduce the size of its money-losing salad and food bars to help reduce expenses and refocus on sandwiches.

Peak 

At its peak in the 1980s, the Rax chain had grown to 504 locations in 38 states along with an unknown number of restaurants in Guatemala.

During this time, Rax began diversifying its core roast beef sales by adding baked potatoes, pizza, and a dinner bar with pasta, Chinese-style food, taco bar, an "endless" salad bar, and a dessert bar.  Rax began to transform its restaurants from basic restaurant architecture into designs containing wood elements and solaria, with the intention of becoming the "champagne of fast food".  This transformation drove away its core working-class customers, blurred its core business, and caused profits to plunge for Rax as other chains, such as Wendy's, took advantage of Rax's techniques and improved on them.

Compounding the decline was a management buyout of the company in 1991 and numerous changes that occurred on the company board. The company attempted to convert under-performing outlets by forming joint ventures with Miami Subs and Red Burrito as they scaled back many of its stand-alone locations to its core markets, particularly in Ohio, Pennsylvania, and West Virginia.

By August 1992, the chain had faded into obscurity. That month, a new advertising campaign was formulated with Deutsch Inc. to create a new animated character named Mr. Delicious, a sportcoat-wearing, briefcase-toting divorcee, to attract adult customers. Three months after the Mr. Delicious campaign began, Rax Restaurants Inc. filed for bankruptcy.

Post 1992 bankruptcy 

In 1994, Rax Restaurants Inc. merged with North Carolina-based Franchise Enterprises Inc, renaming the company Heartland Food Systems Inc., and becoming a Hardee's franchisee.  Heartland planned to convert all Rax restaurants into Hardee's by 1997. However, by 1996, the difficulty of converting Rax restaurants to Hardee's placed too much pressure on Heartland, and they were forced to once again file for Chapter 11 bankruptcy. As part of a turnaround plan, the company sold the Hardee's units it owned that were not originally Rax stores and changed the company's name back to Rax Restaurants Inc.

By 1999, the chain had dropped to 150 franchises, with 450 locations.

The company was planning a revival for the Rax concept, including a new, simpler menu, a new store prototype, and a new logo and color scheme. However, in November 1996, Wendy's International made an offer to purchase 37 Rax restaurants, intending to convert most of them to Tim Hortons. This caused a change in strategy, and a buyer was sought for the remaining company-owned restaurants.
In July 1997, the Rax brand was purchased by Cassady & Associates.

By December 2005, the brand was owned by Carpediem Management Co., with 51 locations, of which 11 were company-owned and 40 were franchisee-owned. As other fast food chains added kids' meals, Rax created its mascot, Uncle Alligator, who featured in all the kids' meals and toys, always involving some sport or activity (e.g. skateboarding). In 2006, 26 locations remained in Illinois, Indiana, Kentucky, Ohio, Pennsylvania, Virginia, and West Virginia. In December 2007, Rich Donohue, a five-year franchise owner with a restaurant in Ironton, Ohio, purchased the Rax trademark. The new company, From Rax to Rich's Inc., purchased the name to bypass licensing costs, and had plans to open more restaurants in Ohio and Kentucky.

The last Rax in Indiana closed in 2011. By February 2015, 15 locations were left in Illinois, Kentucky, and Ohio, and West Virginia. The last Rax in West Virginia closed in 2016 and the number of locations declined to eight by March 2016. Most of the remaining Rax locations are franchisee-owned, with the right to use the Rax name as long as the store is in operation.

, a map at the Rax website shows eight locations, six in southern Ohio, and one each in Kentucky and Illinois. However, the locations in Georgetown, Ohio, and  West Union, Ohio, listed on the Rax website are no longer open with, respectively, a Little Caesars and a Dairy Queen operating in their old locations. On the website's coupon page, last updated with coupons that will expire 31 December 2022, the coupons themselves list just six locations: Harlan, Kentucky; Joliet, Illinois; Circleville, Ohio; Ironton, Ohio; Lancaster, Ohio; and New Carlisle, Ohio.

Slogans
"All the Right Stuff"
"Fast Food with Style."
"Gotta get back to Rax."
"I'd Rather Rax, Wouldn't You?"
"You can eat here."

References

External links

Beef
Companies based in Ohio
Restaurants in Ohio
Economy of the Midwestern United States
Regional restaurant chains in the United States
Fast-food chains of the United States
Restaurants established in 1967
Companies that filed for Chapter 11 bankruptcy in 1992
1967 establishments in Ohio
General Foods
Roast beef restaurants in the United States